Wat Ratchaburana is the name of multiple Thai Buddhist temples. The name may refer to:
 Wat Ratchaburana, Ayutthaya
 Wat Ratchaburana, Bangkok
 Wat Ratchaburana, Phitsanulok